Shumilin is a Russian masculine surname, its feminine counterpart is Shumilina. It may refer to
Andrey Shumilin (born 1970), Russian wrestler
Sergei Shumilin (born 1990), Russian football player

See also
Shumilina Raion in Vitebsk Region, Belarus

Russian-language surnames